Joon-tae is a Korean masculine given name. Its meaning differs based on the hanja used to write each syllable of the name. There are 20 hanja with the reading "tae" and 34 hanja with the reading "joon" on the South Korean government's official list of hanja which may be registered for use in given names.

People with this name include:
Kim Joon-tae (footballer) (born 1985), South Korean footballer
Park Jun-tae (born 1989), South Korean footballer
Kim Joon-tae, South Korean taekwondo practitioner

Fictional characters with this name include:
Oh Joon-tae, in 2002 South Korean television series Successful Story of a Bright Girl

See also
List of Korean given names

References

Korean masculine given names